The Space Pirates is the mostly missing sixth serial of the sixth season of the British science fiction television series Doctor Who, which originally aired in six weekly parts from 8 March to 12 April 1969.

In this serial, the TARDIS materialises in Earth's future on a space beacon just before it is attacked by pirates, led by Caven (Dudley Foster). The travellers find themselves trapped in a sealed section of the beacon that is blown apart and flown to where the pirates will plunder it of the precious mineral argonite. They witness a conflict between the pirates and the Interstellar Space Corps, led by General Hermack (Jack May) and Major Warne (Donald Gee).

This is the second story written by Robert Holmes, one of the show's most successful scriptwriters, who would subsequently become the show's script editor during the Tom Baker era. Only one of the six episodes is held in the BBC archives; five remain missing. Chronologically, this is the last story to contain missing episodes, which makes episode six the last episode of Doctor Who to be completely missing.

Plot

Beacons on the space lanes are being blown up and plundered for precious argonite by a gang of space pirates led by Caven, and his associate Dervish.  The Earth Space Corps cruiser V-41 notices the destruction of the beacon and, with General Hermack and Major Warne in charge, sets out to apprehend the pirates. Another beacon is destroyed despite their best efforts, and the fragments are stolen using rocket propulsion. Hermack deploys troops to all nearby beacons to prevent another robbery.

The TARDIS crew arrive on Beacon Alpha Four shortly before the pirates reach it. Caven and his men kill the security force there, save Lt Sorba, who is taken as a hostage, and the pirates seal the time travellers in part of the Beacon before blowing it to pieces. Fortunately the beacon falls into discrete, sealed pieces and the Doctor, Jamie, and Zoe find themselves inside one. The eccentric Milo Clancey, in his aged ship, the LIZ-79, rescues them – but they cannot retrieve the TARDIS, which is in a separate segment taken by the pirates.

The nearest inhabited world is Ta, dominated by the Issigri Mining Corporation, whose leader is Madeleine Issigri. The firm was founded by her father and Clancey, and the latter is now suspected of Dom Issigri’s murder, though nothing has been proved. Hermack visits Ta, believing that Clancey, whom he suspects of being the pirate leader, will end up there in due course – and he is right. However, Hermack leaves just as Clancey and the TARDIS crew reach Ta. Zoe has plotted the trajectory of the segments of the beacon and believes they were headed for Ta as well, and the Doctor and his companions soon find the pirate headquarters. They evade capture and make contact with Clancey.

Meanwhile, Caven forces Dervish to reroute some of the beacon fragments to Lobos, a frontier world where Clancey has his base, so as to throw suspicion on the prospector. It is clear that someone has tipped him off about the Corps' suspicion of Milo Clancey. Hermack and his crew see through this ruse, but it takes time, and they spend hours orbiting Lobos while the real action is taking place on Ta.

When the Doctor and his party reach Madeleine’s offices it becomes clear that she is in league with Caven, and the Doctor and his friends are imprisoned, while Sorba is killed. Their prison is the study of Dom Issigri – alive but frail and scared – and it takes time for him to recover his wits. Madeleine has meanwhile decided to break her alliance with Caven, and does so by radioing Hermack to bring his troops to Ta. Caven reasserts his authority by telling Madeleine her father is alive and threatening to kill him unless she falls in line.  She responds by contacting Hermack again and telling him not to come to Ta.

The Doctor and his companions have meanwhile escaped, taking the weak Dom Issigri with them, and head to the LIZ-79. Caven has thought ahead and forced Dervish to cut the oxygen supply to the ship. As only Milo and Dom board the ship, theirs are the lives in danger, and Caven’s callousness finally convinces Madeleine to support him no longer. The Doctor, Jamie and Zoe save their friends and Dom Issigri makes contact with Hermack, persuading him of the truth of the situation.

Caven now gets desperate, threatening to destroy Ta, the Issigri base, and the orbiting V-ship by means of a series of bombs. The Doctor manages to disengage the triggering device, while Major Warne blows Caven and Dervish’s ship to pieces. As Hermack’s ship lands, Madeleine looks forward to a reunion with her father, but knows she will also be imprisoned for her part in the conspiracy, while the Doctor and his companions prepare to seek out the TARDIS on one of the fragments of the beacon.

Production

 Episode is missing

This serial was written as a replacement for The Dream Spinner by Paul Wheeler, which for technical reasons was dropped at a late stage in production. This is the last story to be produced by Peter Bryant, although it was originally intended that he receive the producer's credit on Doctor Who and the Silurians. This changed when Barry Letts was appointed the series' producer on a full-time basis.

Patrick Troughton, Frazer Hines and Wendy Padbury were all away on location filming The War Games during the production of episode six and appear only in pre-filmed inserts. Thus, this is one of only two 1960s episodes to have none of the regular cast present for a studio recording, the other being the 1965 story "Mission to the Unknown".

This was the first Doctor Who serial on which John Nathan-Turner worked as a floor assistant. Nathan-Turner would become the unit production manager of the show in 1977 and the producer in 1980, a role he held until the series' cancellation in 1989.

Missing episodes
All episodes, except Episode 2 (preserved as an original negative 35mm film telerecording), are missing from the BBC archives. Pre-filmed inserts from Episode 1 also exist, as well as the audio soundtrack for all episodes. Episode 6 of the story is chronologically the final missing episode of Doctor Who. The only reason Episode 2 survives is due to it rather unusually being a 35mm film studio show recording. The BBC deemed it "historically significant" and retained their copy.

In 1998, Episode 2 of this story (the single episode already held in the BBC archives) was discovered in the collection of an amateur video enthusiast. The episode is the earliest known existing off-air domestic videotape recording of an episode of Doctor Who.

This is the final story which is considered to have episodes missing due to no video being known to exist. Whilst part 1 of the Third Doctor story The Mind of Evil is missing its authentic colour image data, it still has complete video, even if only available in either monochrome (on VHS) or manually colourised form (on DVD and Blu-ray).

Commercial releases

In print

A novelisation of this serial, written by Terrance Dicks, was published by Target Books in March 1990. An audiobook, based on the novelisation was released in December 2016, read by Terry Molloy.

Home media
Episode 2 was released on VHS in 1991 on Doctor Who - The Troughton Years, the introduction for the episode being recorded in the Lime Grove Studios where Episode One had been taped. In November 2004, it was released on Region 2 DVD in the three-disc Lost in Time box set. The DVD also includes surviving pre-filmed inserts from Episode 1. In February 2003, the audio soundtrack was released on CD with linking narration by Frazer Hines.

See also
 List of space pirates

References

External links

Target novelisation

On Target — The Space Pirates

Second Doctor serials
Space pirates
Doctor Who missing episodes
Doctor Who serials novelised by Terrance Dicks
1969 British television episodes